Club Deportivo Litoral is a professional football team based in La Paz Department, Bolivia that competes in the Bolivian Primera División.

Honours

National
Bolivian Primera División
Winners (1): 1954

References

Association football clubs established in 1932
Football clubs in Bolivia
1932 establishments in Bolivia